The Movie Album may refer to:

 The Movie Album (Barbra Streisand album), Barbra Streisand's 30th studio album from 2003.
 The Movie Album (Ramsey Lewis album), Ramsey Lewis's 24th studio album from 1966.